York Harbor is a census-designated place (CDP) in the town of York in York County, Maine, United States. The population was 3,033 at the 2010 census. York Harbor is a distinguished former Gilded Age summer colony noted for its resort architecture. It is part of the Portland–South Portland–Biddeford, Maine Metropolitan Statistical Area.

History

York was a prosperous seaport in the 18th century. Its harbor, then known as Lower Town, was lined with wharves and warehouses to which upriver settlers brought their goods for trade and shipping. The tongue of land at the mouth of the York River was called Gallows Point, where criminals at Old York Gaol in York Village were hanged. At high tide the tongue became an island, from which a ferry licensed in 1652 crossed to Seabury.

During the American Revolution, fishermen and their families abandoned the Isles of Shoals off the coast and floated their homes to the Lower Town waterfront, where they were rebuilt. They hauled their boats at Lobster Cove and dried their catch on fish flakes, after which the tongue would be named Stage Neck. In 1807, President Thomas Jefferson's embargo crippled local mercantile trade, and by the Civil War, Stage Neck had deteriorated into a ramshackle slum.

After the Union victory, Nathaniel Grant Marshall (1812-1882), a lawyer, had a vision to convert the poorest section of Lower Town into a first-class summer emporium for wealthy tourists. He bought Stage Neck, razed the fishermen's shacks and in 1871 built a grand hotel called the Marshall House. As part of its upgrade, Lower Town was renamed York Harbor. Steamers began arriving with families drawn to the Maine shore from the heat and pollution in Boston, New York, Chicago, Philadelphia and Baltimore. Many liked the area enough to build summer mansions, characteristically in the Shingle Style, during the 1880-1890 boom. Soon York Harbor joined Bar Harbor and Newport as fashionable East Coast summer destinations.

Competing hotels were built, including Harmon Hall and the Albracca Hotel. But the Marshall House was the largest, accommodating 325 guests by 1900. It offered telephone and telegraph offices, a livery stable, riding and bathing facilities, tennis courts, barbershop, billiards room, ballroom, sailing, fishing excursions and canoes for picnics up the York River. The Marshalls started both an electric and water company, and headed the effort to build the York Harbor & Beach Railroad, opened in 1887.

When the Marshall House burned in 1916, it was rebuilt in fire-resistant brick the following year to designs by noted Portland architect John Calvin Stevens. It resumed its role as the center of York Harbor social life. At its porte-cochère, chauffeur-driven limousines from the estates deposited their owners in evening gowns and tuxedoes, to be joined by hotel patrons for dinner at 7:30 p.m. Post-prandial entertainments included chamber music by a Boston Symphony ensemble in the lobby, or Saturday dancing and costume parties in the ballroom.

But a rift grew between York Harbor and York Beach further up the coast, which catered to the less affluent. The former disapproved of the latter's "cottage and campground" philosophy, and tried to prevent the trolley connecting the two. In 1908, York Harbor proposed secession from York, first as a new town called Yorktown, then as Gorges after Sir Ferdinando Gorges, the early proprietor of Maine. Because the split would have deprived remaining York of much of real value within the community, including the town hall, it failed and The Yorks reconciled.

Development here began in the 1870s and virtually ended in the 1920s, leaving York Harbor a microcosm of period resort architecture, now converted for year-round use. The Marshall House was sold in 1957 and demolished in 1972, to be replaced with condominiums and the Stage Neck Inn (designed by Sasaki, Dawson, DeMay Associates). However, the York community retains a wealth of Second Empire, Shingle Style, Mission Revival and Colonial Revival architecture. Of particular note are the Lancaster Building designed by E. B. Blaisdell and built in 1895, Trinity Episcopal Church designed by H. J. Hardenbergh and built in 1908, and the York Harbor Reading Room designed by James Purdon and built in 1910. The Cliff Walk, an ancient shoreline path lined with beach roses, winds along Eastern Point ledges above the surf.

Geography
York Harbor is located at  (43.142573, -70.647106). The York Harbor CDP extends westward to include all of York Village as well.  The western boundary of the CDP is U.S. Route 1, the southern boundary is the York River, and the northern boundary abuts the southern edge of the Cape Neddick CDP, more commonly known as York Beach. The Gulf of Maine, an arm of the Atlantic Ocean, forms the eastern edge of the community.

Demographics

As of the census of 2000, there were 3,321 people, 1,334 households, and 895 families residing in the CDP. The racial makeup of the CDP was 98.13% White, 0.12% African American, 0.06% Native American, 0.57% Asian, 0.21% from other races, and 0.90% from two or more races. Hispanic or Latino of any race were 0.63% of the population.

There were 1,334 households, out of which 28.1% had children under the age of 18 living with them, 58.5% were married couples living together, 6.9% had a female householder with no husband present, and 32.9% were non-families. 28.3% of all households were made up of individuals, and 13.3% had someone living alone who was 65 years of age or older. The average household size was 2.35 and the average family size was 2.88.

In the CDP, the population was spread out, with 21.9% under the age of 18, 4.2% from 18 to 24, 22.5% from 25 to 44, 27.7% from 45 to 64, and 23.7% who were 65 years of age or older. The median age was 46 years. For every 100 females, there were 81.8 males. For every 100 females age 18 and over, there were 78.9 males.

The median income for a household in the CDP was $53,969, and the median income for a family was $71,164. Males had a median income of $49,706 versus $30,850 for females. The per capita income for the CDP was $29,016. About 1.0% of families and 5.3% of the population were below the poverty line, including 2.4% of those under age 18 and 11.9% of those age 65 or over.

References

Further reading
 John D. Bardwell, A History of York Harbor & The York Harbor Reading Room, 1993; Old York Historical Society; Peter E. Randall, publisher; Portsmouth, New Hampshire
 Virginia S. Spiller (editor), 350 Years as York, 2001; published by the Town of York 350th Committee; York, Maine

External links
 Town of York, Maine
 Old York Historical Society
 York Public Library
 Agamenticus Yacht Club
 The York Harbor Reading Room

Census-designated places in Maine
Portland metropolitan area, Maine
Census-designated places in York County, Maine
 
Populated coastal places in Maine